Koshiro Yamamuro (山室 公志郎, born July 14, 1987) is a Japanese former professional baseball pitcher. He played with the Chiba Lotte Marines in Japan's Nippon Professional Baseball in 2010.

External links

1987 births
Living people
People from Yokohama
Aoyama Gakuin University alumni
Japanese baseball players
Nippon Professional Baseball pitchers
Chiba Lotte Marines players